Harald Martin Brattbakk (born 1 February 1971) is a Norwegian former professional footballer who played as a striker. He was the all-time top scorer in the Norwegian top division with 166 goals in 255 matches, before being surpassed by Sigurd Rushfeldt in 2011. After his retirement from playing he became a pilot.

Club career
Brattbakk was born in Trondheim. He has played for Kolstad, Rosenborg BK, Celtic, F.C. Copenhagen and Bodø/Glimt (loan).

Brattbakk is most known for his goalscoring abilities for the Norwegian club Rosenborg BK where he has enjoyed three spells (1990–91, 1994–97 and 2001–06) scoring most of his goals which has helped him reach the top of the all-time goalscoring chart in the Norwegian Premier League.

At Celtic, where he played from December 1997 to January 2000, Brattbakk seemed overawed by the pressures of playing for one of Scotland's Old Firm clubs. Though he did enjoy some success with the club — including hitting the clinching goal against St Johnstone to help them win the SPL title on the final day of the 1997–1998 season, and scoring all four goals in a 4–0 win over Kilmarnock that same year — his spell in Glasgow was generally characterised by nervous performances and insufficient goals.

However, Brattbakk has been very successful in Norway. With 166 goals he was the highest-scoring player in the history of the Norwegian Premier League, until his record was beat by Sigurd Rushfeldt on 29 May 2011. Moreover, his record in the Champions League is an impressive one, and includes goals against such top sides as Real Madrid and Milan. He scored 28 goals in 66 matches for Rosenborg BK and scored 4 goals in 9 matches for Celtic in various European Cups. In November 2001, he scored twice against his old club Celtic as Rosenborg defeated them 2–0 in a Champions League tie in Trondheim.

Brattbakk returned to Rosenborg after being on a loan to Bodø/Glimt in the last half of the 2005 season, but on 20 February 2006 it was announced that he had been relieved from his contract and he has now retired from the game.

In 2008 Brattbakk made a comeback in football after signing a contract with his native Kolstad-Fotball, an amateur club in the Norwegian 3rd Division Dep. 19. However, the comeback lasted only for the rest of the 2008 season.

International career
Brattbakk made his debut for Norway in a February 1995 friendly match against Estonia in which he scored two goals. He went on to play seventeen times for his country, scoring five goals.

Retirement
On 21 November 2006, Brattbakk announced on the Norwegian television channel TV3 that he intended to become an airline pilot after his retirement from professional football. He trained as a pilot in Florida at Phoenix East Aviation, Inc. and got his commercial aircraft certification in 2008. Until 2010 he flew for the aircraft company Helitrans, based at Trondheim Airport, Værnes. This included missions for Norwegian Coast Guard. From 2010 he has been working as a pilot for Norwegian Air Shuttle.

Personal life
His son Filip Brattbakk plays for Rosenborg.

Career statistics

Honours
Bodø/Glimt
Norwegian Cup: 1993

Rosenborg
Tippeligaen: 1994, 1995, 1996, 1997, 2001, 2002, 2003, 2004
Norwegian Cup: 1995, 2003

Celtic
Scottish Premier Division: 1997–98

Copenhagen
Danish Superliga: 2000–01

Individual
Tippeligaen top scorer: 1994, 1995, 1996, 2002, 2003
Kniksen Award Striker of the Year: 1994, 1995, 1997, 2003

External links

References

1971 births
Living people
Footballers from Trondheim
Norwegian aviators
Norwegian footballers
Norway international footballers
Rosenborg BK players
FK Bodø/Glimt players
Celtic F.C. players
F.C. Copenhagen players
Danish Superliga players
Eliteserien players
Norwegian First Division players
Scottish Football League players
Scottish Premier League players
Kniksen Award winners
Norwegian expatriate footballers
Norwegian expatriate sportspeople in Scotland
Expatriate men's footballers in Denmark
Expatriate footballers in Scotland
Association football forwards
Commercial aviators